Monkellan Parish is a civil parish of Murray County, New South Wales.

Its western border is formed by the Murrumbidgee River and its southern border by Michelago creek. It includes most of Michelago.

References

Localities in New South Wales
Parishes of Murray County
Snowy Monaro Regional Council